WHPS may refer to:

 Waterkloof House Preparatory School, Pretoria, South Africa
 The West Hartford Public Schools school district
 Whitchurch Highlands Public School
 White House Press Secretary
 WHPS-CD, a low-power television station (channel 15) licensed to serve Detroit, Michigan, United States